Decebalo is an opera in two acts by Leonardo Leo premiered in 1743. The plot concerns Decebalus, king of the Dacians.

Recordings
Angelo Manzotti, Adrian George Popescu, Julia Surdu, Sorin Dumitrascu, Ruxandra Ibric Cioranu. Romabarocca Ensemble Lorenzo Tozzi 2CD Bongiovanni 2006

References

1743 operas
Operas by Leonardo Leo
Operas